Potterless is an audio podcast created by Mike Schubert. The podcast follows Schubert as he reads the Harry Potter series for the first time. Each episode covers a section of the book series and later the movies and fan material as Schubert and at least one guest analyze the story, writing, and characters. In the US the podcast charts in the top 40 for Arts and Entertainment podcasts and in the top 60 for comedy podcasts on Spotify.

History
Schubert wanted to start a podcast and was looking for a popular topic that many people felt passionate about. He “knew people have incredibly strong feelings about ‘Harry Potter,’ but I hadn't read the series,” and he believed that an adult reading the series would be an interesting topic for listeners. In an interview with The Rowling Library magazine, Schubert explained the origin of the name "Potterless" as a double pun based on both Pottermore (now Wizarding World) and the fact he had not read the series and so was Potter-less.

Schubert started the podcast assuming his snarky remarks as he criticized the books, counterpointed by his Potter-fan guests' defense of the books, would be entertaining listening. He did not expect to enjoy the books but ended up falling in love with them. According to TU Delfts' Delta, the podcast was conceptualized as one that would "pick apart the story and dethrone it from its lofty perch" but turns into one that "celebrates as the story gets richer."

Schubert began reading Harry Potter and the Sorcerer’s Stone, and the first episode of the podcast launched in October of that year. Episodes were initially released bi-weekly, but the release schedule was switched to weekly in 2019. The last book material was covered in episode 89, after which Schubert began covering the Harry Potter films and spin-off materials such as Harry Potter and the Cursed Child. The last regular episode of Potterless was released on August 30, 2021.

Schubert decided to move onto the Percy Jackson series by Rick Riordan; the podcast’s first full episode was released on September 6th, 2021, and is named The Newest Olympian. Even with focusing on a new young adults book series, Schubert is planning on releasing content via Potterless from events such as live shows.

Besides The Newest Olympian, Schubert hosts or co-hosts three other podcasts: Horse, Meddling Adults, and Modern Muckraker.

On October 4th, 2022, it was announced by Multitude Productions that Schubert, and his podcasts, had left the production company.

Format
Each episode of the first 89 is dedicated to a chapter or chapters of the book series in chronological reading order. After he finished the books, he started watching the movies and discussed them. Later he discussed anything Harry Potter related, such as the spin-off books and movies, A Very Potter Musical and Puffs. Episodes are approximately 60 minutes in length, and consist primarily of Schubert and his guest(s) summarizing the plot and providing commentary.

Recurring segments include British Quandaries, in which British citizen Dottie James answers questions from Mike and his American guests regarding British-isms and whether things such as treacle tart are British or magical in origin.

Schubert donates a portion of his Patreon revenues to charity.

Reception
Potterless has charted in the US top 40 for Arts and Entertainment podcasts and US top 60 for comedy podcasts on Spotify. It has been featured by Buzzfeed in lists of recommended podcasts.

The Post called Potterless “the perfect podcast for anyone who has wanted to reread the series but doesn’t have the time… [it] provides listeners with opportunity to recall the first time they read the books and follow along on the beautiful journey of listening to someone else do the same.” Brighton Journal said Schubert's "genuine enthusiasm for the books is charming."

MaineCampus called Schubert "cynical" and "too critical." The Student said Schubert's "complete lack of understanding of everyday British words and phrases threatens to irritate rather than amuse" and that the series might be better led by "a Brit."

References 

Comedy and humor podcasts
Works based on Harry Potter
2016 podcast debuts
Audio podcasts
Harry Potter fandom